Aija is a feminine Latvian given name and may refer to: 
Aija Andrejeva (born 1986), Latvian singer 
Aija Barča (born 1949), Latvian politician
Aija Bārzdiņa, Latvian fashion model
Aija Brumermane (born 1986), Latvian basketball player
Aija Edwards, American curler
Aija Klakocka (born 1986), Latvian basketball player
Aija Kukule (born 1956), Latvian singer 
Aija Putniņa (born 1988), Latvian basketball player 
Aija Salo (born 1977), Finnish politician 
Aija Tērauda, Latvian model

References

Latvian feminine given names